Glenea apicalis is a species of beetle in the family Cerambycidae. It was described by Chevrolat in 1857, originally under the genus Saperda. It has a wide distribution in Africa. It feeds on Hibiscus rosa-sinensis.

Varietas
 Glenea apicalis var. guineensis (Chevrolat, 1861)
 Glenea apicalis var. westermannii (Thomson, 1860)

References

apicalis
Beetles described in 1857